James Benjamin McCullagh (1854–1921) was an Anglican missionary in British Columbia; he worked under the supervision of the Church Missionary Society, a Protestant body with an evangelical program and practices. McCullagh is notable for his linguistic work in translating portions of the Bible and the Book of Common Prayer into the Nisga'a language. He also created several periodicals aimed at Nisga'a audiences, with the assistance of Nisga'a writers and printers. One of these, "Hagaga", is often cited as the first Nisga'a newspaper and as a significant space for discussions about Nisga'a land claim politics. McCullagh was ordained to the diaconate and priesthood in 1890 by the Bishop of Caledonia. His missionary and educational work was centered on the mission village of Aiyansh, British Columbia.

Bibliography
 The nine surviving issues of Hagaga, a Nisga'a and English periodical
 The Caledonia Interchange, an English-language periodical aimed at Nisga'a people and the settler population of the Nass valley.
 A Nishg' a Version of Portions of the Book of Common Prayer (London, 1890)
 The Indian Potlatch: The Substance of a Paper read before C.M.S. Annual Conference at Metlakatla, B.C., 1899
 Ignis: A Parable of the Great Lava Plain in the valley of "Eternal Bloom", Naas River, British Columbia (Aiyansh, c. 1918)
 Red Indians I Have Known (London, c. 1919)
 "Abba, Nigwaud" ... Gením gamzím gígíengwuk'l gan'l anluzabukím Gaud, (Aiyanish, c. 1898)
 Niš'ga Primer (Aiyanish, c. 1895)

References

External links
McCullagh of Aiyansh 1923 biography by J. W. W. Moeran
BC Author Bank article
McCullagh archives in British Columbia

1854 births
1921 deaths
Anglican missionaries in Canada
Canadian Anglican priests
English Anglican missionaries
Pre-Confederation British Columbia people
Linguists from Canada
Writers from British Columbia
Missionary linguists